Eberhard Radzik (born 26 April 1935) is a German boxer. He competed in the men's middleweight event at the 1960 Summer Olympics.

References

1935 births
Living people
German male boxers
Olympic boxers of the United Team of Germany
Boxers at the 1960 Summer Olympics
Sportspeople from Gelsenkirchen
Middleweight boxers